KRAE (1480 AM) is a Class D golden oldies formatted station owned by Pro-shop Radio Broadcasting, located in Cheyenne, Wyoming. The station also produces several local programs per week, and a shared weather forecast is produced for it and sister station KYOY by Proshop. Previously, the station was ESPN affiliated, and the station continued to carry Denver Nuggets games as late as 2019.

History
In its present form, KRAE is generally traced back to 2008 ("12 years ago" from last website update in 2020), when Brahmin Broadcasting Corp ceded KRAE due to improperly installed fencing. Despite this, records suggest KRAE's start was at least 1961, and it existed in the 1970s, possibly alongside or as KCGO.

 (KRAE's logo under previous sports format)

Around 2006, the station had a classic country format which than became an ESPN station. Around this time, there was a major re-shuffle of Cheyenne's AM stations: KRAE's classic country format moved to KRND (now a Regional Mexican station), while KFBC's sports coverage split off into several stations, including KRAE. In the latter half of the shuffle (2012-2016), KRAE lost its ESPN affiliation while KFBC became a complete sports station through CBS Sports Radio. To complete the transition, KRAE became a classic hits orientated station while slowly drifting towards 1950's and 60s music. The station, however, still is responsible for some of Cheyenne's sports content, mainly for some Wyoming Cowboys games, and has signed on a new talk show centered on sports.

Signal
KFBC and KRAE share the same tower on Southwest Road. At 1,000 watts during the daytime, KRAE's signal covers the local urban area, including Altvan to the east and Curt Gowdy State Park to the West. In addition, it can be heard in Northern Colorado with a decent radio. At night, the station drops to 72 watts in order to protect other Class D stations from Skywave interference, mainly KLMS in Lincoln This makes the groundwave signal KRAE's only method, which mainly covers central Cheyenne.

Translator
As of 2021, KRAE operates translator K266CC (101.1 FM) located in Downtown Cheyenne, with 250 watts. The translator shares this tower with several other FM stations, and covers most of Laramie County. Depending on the conditions, the station travels by tropospheric duction to the Nebraska Panhandle, as well as Laramie. Formerly, KRAE operated on K234AH (94.7 FM), which was located in Granite; the translator has since been used by KFBU.

Content
Source: KRAE

The primary focus of KRAE is oldies music format which usually consists of 1950's and 1960's music, however they have been heard playing 1980's music occasionally. Beyond that, KRAE is home to Wyoming Sports Talk Today, airing between 3pm and 5pm Weekdays, a direct competitor to KFBC's "Sports Zone" at 4pm to 6pm. Additionally, Monday through Thursday evenings are home to a re-broadcast of old-time radio dramas, in their entirety, usually beginning around 8pm. KRAE still covers local sporting events when another station can't pick it up, and they are currently under contract with the Denver Nuggets.

References

External links

Oldies radio stations in the United States
RAE
Radio stations established in 1985
1985 establishments in Wyoming